Korka Fall  (born 19 February 1990) is a Senegalese women's international footballer who plays as a forward. She is a member of the Senegal women's national football team. She was part of the team at the 2012 African Women's Championship, and has continued to play for the team through to 2016. On club level she played for Zaragoza CFF in Spain, where she was the first African player in the women's Primera División, and Dorades Mbour in Senegal.

Career

Club
Korka Fall joined Spanish side Zaragoza CFF from Senegalese team Dorades Mbour in April 2010, becoming the first African player to play in the Primera División, the highest level of women's football in Spain. She was signed to a three-year contract, with the move seen as strengthening the squad ready for the Copa de la Reina de Fútbol competition.

By 2012, she had moved to play for Senegalese side Aigles de la Médina. She was nominated in 2013 for African Women's Footballer of the year at the Africa Top Sports Awards, the only Senegalese player to be included in the category. By 2014, Fall was playing for Dorades Mbour once again, in the Senegalese second division. She scored a penalty to win the final match of the season against Teddungal de Vélingara, giving the second division title to Mbour.

International
Fall plays for the Senegal women's national football team, including at the 2012 African Women's Championship. She continued to play for the team, recently during the 2016 Africa Women Cup of Nations qualification when she was brought on as a substitute for Fanta Sy against Guinea.

International goals

References

External links

1990 births
Living people
People from M'Bour
Senegalese women's footballers
Women's association football forwards
Zaragoza CFF players
Senegal women's international footballers
Senegalese expatriate footballers
Senegalese expatriate sportspeople in Spain
Expatriate women's footballers in Spain